The Hancock House is a historic structure in the Hancock's Bridge section of Lower Alloways Creek Township, Salem County, New Jersey, United States. It was the site of the 1778 Hancock's Bridge massacre. The site is on the National Register of Historic Places.

History
The house was built in 1734 for Judge William and Sarah Hancock and features Flemish bond brickwork detailed with blue-glazed bricks, which gives the year of construction (1734) and the initials of the couple for whom it was built: W S for William and Sarah. William died in 1762 and passed the house to his son William, also a judge.

Massacre
On March 21, 1778, Major John Graves Simcoe led approximately 300 British soldiers and Queen's Rangers through a marsh and across Alloway Creek to surround Hancock House. At approximately 5 a.m., they entered the house and surprised 20 to 30 members of the local militia stationed there, along with Judge Hancock, a loyalist who was thought to be away for the night. Eight American men were killed during the melee, including Judge Hancock, who died the following day from 10 stab wounds. The rest were wounded at the scene or during a retreat, or captured as prisoners.

William Abbott and his son Samuel watched in the dawning light from the attic window of their home in Elsinboro, diagonally across the creek from the Hancock House, as the British and Tory soldiers pursued and killed the few American militiamen who had escaped the scene of the carnage at the house and surrounding yard.  The next morning while driving to a meeting in Salem, several British and Tory troops surrounded the Abbott carriage, tormenting the occupants by thrusting their bayonets at them, then showed them blood on their steel weapons and exclaimed, "See the blood of your countrymen."

Other County Colonial lore states that, in the midst of the massacre, the pregnant wife of one of the local militia was sleeping in the Hancock House. She was awakened by the screams of the dying men and jumped from a second story window on the west side of the house to make her escape. Tradition says that, within twenty-four hours, the child was born and that descendants of that child are living in Lower Alloways Creek township today. The old Hancock House museum is said to still have actual massacre blood stains on its attic floor.

See also

 National Register of Historic Places listings in Salem County, New Jersey
 List of the oldest buildings in New Jersey

References

External links

 
The Story of the Hancock House
 
  Hancock House

Houses on the National Register of Historic Places in New Jersey
Houses completed in 1734
Houses in Salem County, New Jersey
New Jersey in the American Revolution
Museums in Salem County, New Jersey
Historic house museums in New Jersey
National Register of Historic Places in Salem County, New Jersey
Lower Alloways Creek Township, New Jersey
American Revolutionary War sites
New Jersey Register of Historic Places
Historic American Buildings Survey in New Jersey
American Revolution on the National Register of Historic Places